Montgomery House is a historic home located near Wilmington, New Castle County, Delaware. It was built in 1789, and is a two- to three-story, three bay wide, gable roofed, Penn Plan banked dwelling of uncoursed fieldstone.  It has a two-story frame addition at the south side of the house that dates from the 1950s.  Also on the property are a contributing frame stable and a small frame well house.

It was added to the National Register of Historic Places in 1988.

References

Houses on the National Register of Historic Places in Delaware
Houses completed in 1805
Houses in Wilmington, Delaware
1805 establishments in Delaware
National Register of Historic Places in Wilmington, Delaware